Pedlar Palmer, born Thomas Palmer, (1876 – 13 February 1949) was an English boxer who held the world bantamweight championship from 1895–1899.

Life
Palmer was born in Canning Town, London on 19 November 1876.  His father was a bare-knuckle champion of Essex, and rumour had it that his mother could take on and beat any woman in London’s East End.  As a boxer, Palmer soon gained the nickname "Box o' Tricks", reflecting his showmanship - he and his brother had taken part in a stage act as children and Palmer utilised some of the things he had leaned on stage in the boxing ring.

In 1893, Palmer won bouts advertised as the "World 100lb" title against Walter Croot and Mike Small, and became World Bantamweight Champion in 1895 when he beat Billy Plimmer of Birmingham on a 14th round foul. He boxed a draw with the World Featherweight Champion George Dixon in New York in 1896.  He kept his bantamweight title through five defenses against Johnny Murphy, Ernie Stanton. Dave Sullivan, Billy Plimmer, and Billy Rochford.

Palmer met Irish born American boxer Dave Sullivan in London on 18 October 1897 in what was billed as a World 116 pound Title Match.  It would be Sullivan's first loss according to most sources.  Sullivan failed to receive the twenty round points decision, but established himself as the primary contender for the World Featherweight Title.

Loss of World Bantamweight Title to Terry McGovern
Palmer lost his title in Tuckahoe, New York in September 1899.  He was knocked out in the first round by Terrible Terry McGovern - Palmer claimed that he had been blinded by the lights.  Having held the Championship for four years, Palmer was still only 22 years old.

Loss of the British Bantamweight Title
In November 1900 Palmer lost the British bantamweight title to Harry Ware, and although he won two out of three fights with George Dixon and beat Digger Stanley, another world champion, he was twice beaten in British featherweight title fights by Ben Jordan and Joe Bowker.

Jordan successfully defended the English Featherweight Title on 12 December 1904 against Palmer in an important bout at the National Sporting Club in London in a fifteen round points decision.

Palmer was a heavy drinker. In April 1907 he killed Robert Croat on a train to Epsom races, for which crime he was convicted of manslaughter and sentenced to five years in prison. On his release he boxed again, but never enjoyed his earlier levels of success. For the last 20 years of his life he was a bookmaker in Brighton, where he died on 13 February 1949, aged 72. He is buried on the western edge of Brighton; the gravestone no longer stands.

Professional boxing record

References

Further reading
Jason McKay, 2009, Box O’ Tricks – The Pedlar Palmer Story

External links
 
Transcript of an 1899 newspaper article about the Palmer vs McGovern fight

1876 births
1949 deaths
Bantamweight boxers
Featherweight boxers
English people convicted of manslaughter
Boxers from Greater London
People from Canning Town
People from Brighton
Prisoners and detainees of England and Wales
English male boxers